Istomin may refer to:

 Denis Istomin (born 1986), Uzbekistan tennis player
 Denis Istomin (ice hockey) (born 1987), Russian ice hockey player
 Eugene Istomin (1925-2003), American pianist
 Marta Casals Istomin (born 1937), Puerto Rican musician
 Vladimir Istomin (1809-1855), Russian admiral
 Yuri Istomin (1944-1999), Ukrainian footballer
 Ivan G. Istomin (1917—1988) — Nenets and Komi author
 Avdotia Istomina (1799–1848), was the most celebrated Imperial Russian ballerina of the 19th century.

Russian-language surnames